Košarkarski klub Elektra Šoštanj, commonly referred to as KK Elektra, is a Slovenian basketball team based in Šoštanj. The club was founded in 1948. Their home arena is Šoštanj Sports Hall.

Honours

Slovenian National Cup
Runners-up: 2009

References

External links
Official website 

Basketball teams established in 1948
Basketball teams in Slovenia
1948 establishments in Slovenia